

Events
Chinese triads the Big Sword Society and the Shangtung-based White Lotus Society are suspected of instigating attacks on Christian missionaries (including Chinese converts) and foreigners. By the end of the decade they have more than 1,000 followers carrying out attacks on isolated missions and trading posts. 
Joseph Pinzolo, Lucchese crime family boss, is born. 
August 13 – Daniel Lyons, who succeeded Danny Driscoll as leader of the Whyos, suffers a gunshot wound to the head by saloon keeper David Murphy and died the following day while at Chambers Street Hospital. Lyons, not to be confused with former leader Danny Lyons, had been tearing up Murphy's saloon along with the nephew of Jerry Hartigan when Murphy shot him. Although immediately turning himself over to police claiming self-defense, he was held in custody at The Tombs.
Chicago Police Chief William McGarigle, in the pay of Chicago crime lord Michael Cassius McDonald, is indicted for graft later fleeing to Canada.

References

Organized crime
Years in organized crime